Sahib's Jazz Party (also released as Conversations) is a live album by American jazz saxophonist/flautist Sahib Shihab recorded at the Jazzhus Montmartre in Copenhagen in 1963 and first released on the Debut label.

Reception

The Allmusic review by Scott Yanow states: "This surprising music is well worth several listens and shows that Shihab was a much more diverse player than is usually thought".

Track listing
All compositions by Sahib Shihab, except where noted.
 "4070 Blues" - 12:02 
 "Charade" (Henry Mancini, Johnny Mercer) - 7:50 
 "Conversations Part I" - 10:40 
 "Conversations Part II" - 3:10 
 "Conversations Part III" - 9:00 
 "Billy Boy" (Traditional) - 12:21 Bonus track on CD reissue 
 "Not Yet" - 10:47 Bonus track on CD reissue 
 "Someday My Prince Will Come" (Frank Churchill, Larry Morey) - 6:40 Bonus track on CD reissue

Personnel 
 Sahib Shihab - curbed soprano saxophone, baritone saxophone, flute
 Allan Botschinsky - flugelhorn
 Ole Molin - guitar
 Niels-Henning Ørsted Pedersen - bass
 Alex Riel - drums 
 Bjarne Rostvold - snare drum

References 

1964 live albums
Sahib Shihab live albums
Debut Records live albums
Albums recorded at Jazzhus Montmartre